Tsuru University (都留文科大学 Tsuru Bunka Daigaku, literally Tsuru University of Humanities) is a small municipal university located in Tsuru City, Yamanashi Prefecture, Japan. The university has around 3,000 students and 85 faculty. The campus rises into the mountains overlooking the 35,000 residents of Tsuru City.

History 

The university was first created by Yamanashi Prefecture in 1953 as the Temporary School for Teacher Training.

In 1955, Tsuru City renamed the facility Tsuru Municipal Junior College to reflect the expanded programming being offered. The school curriculum consisted of two courses: Teacher Training for Primary School Education and Commerce. In 1960, the college was reorganized into a four-year university and became Tsuru University. The curriculum emphasized a liberal arts education overseen by a Faculty of Humanities.

Many alumni have gone on to become teachers all over Japan.

Japanese Studies Program 
Tsuru University inaugurated its Japanese Studies in Tsuru (JST) Program in 1998 under an agreement with the University of California as a part of bilateral efforts to promote friendly relations and academic exchange between the two universities.  This program is administered by Professor Mineko Takiguchi.  Every semester, an average of 10 UC students have the opportunity to take classes in Japanese language and culture.  In exchange, Tsuru students are able to compete for the chance to study at any of the UC campuses.

The first international contact came about in 1978 when then-student Masanori Sakaguchi (currently retired school principal in Wakayama Prefecture) invited an Asian-American friend to stay with him and to tour the campus. Thus sparked a greater interest by many in the student body in international relations.

Undergraduate courses 

 Faculty of Humanities
 Primary School Education
 Japanese Literature
 English Literature
 Sociology
 Comparative Culture
 Global Education

Graduate courses 
 Graduate School of Humanities (Master Courses only)
 Clinical Pedagogy
 Japanese Literature
 English Literature
 Sociology
 Comparative Culture

References

External links 

  Tsuru University
  都留文科大学
 Japanese Studies at Tsuru

Universities and colleges in Yamanashi Prefecture
Public universities in Japan
Educational institutions established in 1953
1953 establishments in Japan
Tsuru, Yamanashi